The 1977 Dutch Grand Prix was a Formula One motor race held at Circuit Zandvoort on 28 August 1977.

Report

In qualifying, Mario Andretti took his fifth pole of the season with Jacques Laffite alongside on the front row, and James Hunt third. At the start, Hunt jumped both the front row starters to lead but before the end of the first lap, Andretti tried to drive alongside him but some aggressive defending from Hunt forced him to lift, and Laffite took advantage to get second. Five laps later, Andretti had got back past Laffite and was attacking Hunt, who again defended aggressively but this time Andretti did not lift and they collided. Hunt was out on the spot, whereas Andretti spun and rejoined fourth. Brian Henton was disqualified after he was push started after he spun off.

This left Laffite leading from the Ferraris of Niki Lauda and Carlos Reutemann. The latter had a long battle with Andretti for third, repeatedly exchanging places, until the Lotus driver's engine blew up. Soon after, Lauda passed Laffite to take the lead, and he went on build a gap and win comfortably. Laffite finished second. After Andretti's demise, Reutemann ran third until the second Lotus of Gunnar Nilsson attacked him, and the two collided with Nilsson out and Reutemann rejoining at the back. This sensationally left Patrick Tambay in the Ensign third, but he ran out of fuel on the last lap, thus handing the place to Scheckter.

This meant that Lauda had a 21-point lead over Scheckter with four races left.

Classification

Qualifying

Race

Championship standings after the race

Drivers' Championship standings

Constructors' Championship standings

Note: Only the top five positions are included for both sets of standings. Only the best 8 results from the first 9 races and the best 7 results from the remaining 8 races were retained. Numbers without parentheses are retained points; numbers in parentheses are total points scored.

References

Dutch Grand Prix
Dutch Grand Prix
Grand Prix
Dutch Grand Prix